Saint Vincent's Academy of Apalit, Pampanga, Inc., formerly known as Saint Vincent's Child Study Center, is a non-sectarian school founded in 1985 through the efforts of the late Ms. Magdalene E. Lugue.

History
The school started only with 18 pupils in the pre-elementary education under the advisership of Mrs. Melania Mendoza-Quiroz, the first educator who rendered her service to the school. In the year 2001, the elementary course struggled to house the growing population until many classrooms were put up. The school reached its goal with the support of the people who dedicated a part of their lives in the institution. They were the former teachers and the present faculty members of the school who contributed and who are contributing much to its progress. The greatest achievement of the school is the high school department and this is realized by the late administratrix Mrs. Aurora Lugue-Sarmiento, the younger sister of the foundress.

With the growing responsibilities in the school should be attended, Mr. Eduardo V. Lugue one of the faculty members was promoted as the principal of the High School Department.

St. Vincent's Academy of Apalit, Pampanga, Inc. is ideally located in the semi-urban area where it is surrounded by fruit-bearing trees that provide shade to the pupils. It is attended in the border of San Vicente and San Juan (Poblacion). From the east, it is half a kilometer away from the municipal hall, puericulture center and from the west, is the Apalit Public Market. The school can be reached via the Apalit Municipal road from the MacArthur Highway and the Apalit Poblacion. The institution is well known in the whole town of Apalit, San Simon, Sto. Domingo, Minalin, Macabebe, Masantol, Pampanga and Calumpit, Bulacan.

References
 

Schools in Pampanga
Educational institutions established in 1985
1985 establishments in the Philippines